Don't Worry Chachu is an Indian sitcom which premiered on SAB TV on 3 October 2011. The series starred Aasif Sheikh and Sugandha Mishra in the lead.

Cast
Aasif Sheikh as Chintan Desai 
Sugandha Mishra as Bhawana C. Desai 
Anang Desai as Popatlal Desai 
Sachin Parikh as Chirag Desai
Deepti Devi as Ayushi
Firdaus Dadi

Music by
Abhijeet Hegdepatil

References

External links
Don't Worry Chachu Official Site on SAB TV

Sony SAB original programming
Indian comedy television series
Indian television sitcoms
2011 Indian television series debuts
2012 Indian television series endings
Television series by Optimystix Entertainment